Eucereon tripunctatum is a moth of the subfamily Arctiinae. It was described by Herbert Druce in 1884. It is found in Mexico, Guatemala, Panama and Costa Rica.

References

 

tripunctatum
Moths described in 1884